Sterling Martin Beaumon (born June 2, 1995) is an American actor. He is known for his roles as Max Doyle in the 2008 film, Mostly Ghostly, and as young Benjamin Linus in the ABC television series, Lost. Beaumon has had guest roles in Law & Order SVU, Criminal Minds, CSI: Crime Scene Investigation. He has starred in series such as The Killing and as "Seamus" on the television show Clue, on The Hub channel.

Life and career
Beaumon guest-starred on an episode of the NBC series, ER, as well as episodes of Bones, Scrubs, Gary Unmarried, Cold Case, and Crossing Jordan. He portrayed the young Benjamin Linus on the hit ABC series Lost.

He also appeared on the CBS series Criminal Minds in an episode entitled "Safe Haven." He followed that with work on the NBC series, Law & Order SVU. His mother was portrayed by actress/producer, Rita Wilson. He worked with Colin Firth, Emily Blunt and Anne Heche in the 2012 film, Arthur Newman.

Beaumon's voice-over work includes one of the English voices in the Japanese anime series Gunsword and the CGI created Astro Boy film. He was cast as Gabriel Walraven in the ABC series Red Widow.  The series aired between March and May 2013. In 2014, he portrayed Lincoln Knopf on the fourth and final season of the Netflix series, The Killing.

Filmography

References

External links

Star Spotlight: Sterling Beaumon

1995 births
Living people
American male child actors
American male film actors
American male television actors
American male voice actors
Male actors from San Diego
21st-century American male actors